The 2020 Italian Basketball Supercup, also known as Eurosport Supercoppa 2020 for sponsorship reasons, was the 26th edition of the super cup tournament, organized by the Lega Basket Serie A (LBA).

For the first time in history, all the teams of LBA took part in the Supercup, due to the early conclusion of the 2019–20 season caused by COVID-19 pandemic.

Participant teams

Group stage

Group A

Group B

Group C

Group D

Final Four

Semifinals

AX Armani Exchange Milano vs. Umana Reyer Venezia

Banco di Sardegna Sassari vs. Segafredo Virtus Bologna

Final

AX Armani Exchange Milano vs. Segafredo Virtus Bologna

Sponsors

References

External links
 LBA Supercoppa official website

Italian Basketball Cup
2020–21 in Italian basketball